The Cosworth CR is a series of 3.0-litre, naturally-aspirated V10 Formula One engines, designed by Cosworth in partnership and collaboration with Ford; used between  and . The customer engines were used by Stewart, Jaguar, Arrows, Jordan, and Minardi.

Overview
The Stewart Grand Prix team effectively became the Ford works team, and used Cosworth CR-1 engines from its first season in 1997, which was a much lighter version of VJM, ultimately reaching 770 bhp at 16,500 rpm by 2001. Over the next few years Ford had increased its involvement with the Stewart team, and finally bought the team, renaming it Jaguar Racing for 2000. Jaguar pulled out of F1 at the end of 2004, but the team (renamed Red Bull Racing) continued to use Cosworth V10 engines until switching to a Ferrari V8 for 2006. Minardi also used re-badged Cosworth engines until 2005.

Complete Formula One results
(key)

* All points scored with the Cosworth TJ2005 engine.

References

Ford engines
Cosworth
V10 engines
Formula One engines